Aci Catena is a town and comune in Metropolitan City of Catania, Sicily, southern Italy.

Main sights
Among the churches in town are the Santuario Maria Santissima della Catena and Santa Lucia.

Twin towns
  Ceuta, Spain
 Catenanuova, Italy
 Campofiorito, Italy

References

External links

Official website

Cities and towns in Sicily
Aci Catena